Hoskera is a panchayat village in Shahapur taluka of Yadgir district in Karnataka state, India. Hoskera is four kilometres by road north-northwest of Wanadurga, and just over eight kilometres south-southwest of Gogikona. The nearest railhead is in Yadgir.

There are three villages in the gram panchayat: Hoskera, Rajapur, and Shettikera.

Demographics 
At the 2001 census, the village of Hoskera had 2,773 inhabitants, with 1,410 males and 1,363 females.

Notes

External links 
 

Villages in Yadgir district